Krenn is a surname. Notable people with the surname include:

 Franz Krenn, Austrian composer
 Harald W. Krenn, Austrian biologist
 Kurt Krenn, (1936-2014), Austrian Catholic bishop
 Sherrie Austin (born Sherrie Krenn), Australian actress and singer
 Werner Krenn, Austrian tenor

See also 
 Kren
 Dominique Crenn, a French chef